Everybody's Baby is a 1939 American comedy film directed by Malcolm St. Clair and starring Jed Prouty, Shirley Deane and Spring Byington. It was part of Twentieth Century Fox's Jones Family series of films. The film's art direction was by Bernard Herzbrun and Boris Leven.

Plot 
An author moves to the area with radical views on raising children.

Cast
 Jed Prouty as John Jones  
 Shirley Deane as Bonnie Thompson  
 Spring Byington as Mrs. John Jones  
 Russell Gleason as Herbert Thompson  
 June Carlson as Lucy Jones  
 Florence Roberts as Granny Jones  
 Billy Mahan as Bobby Jones 
 Reginald Denny as Dr. Pilcoff  
 Robert Allen as Dick Lane  
 Claire Du Brey as Nurse Cordell  
 Marvin Stephens as Tommy McGuire  
 Hattie McDaniel as Hattie  
 Arthur Loft as Chief Kelly  
 Howard C. Hickman as Dr. Jenkins 
 George Ernest as Roger Jones  
 Kenneth Howell as Jack Jones 
 James Blaine as Plainclothes Man  
 Stanley Blystone as Plainclothes Man  
 Romaine Callender as Salesman  
 George Chandler as G. Randolph  
 James Flavin as Police Announcer 
 Phyllis Fraser as Millie 
 Aggie Herring as Mrs. Diggs  
 Robert Lowery as B. Wilson 
 Mickey Martin as Ratty Diggs  
 Sam McDaniel as Master of Ceremonies  
 Frank Moran as Tough  
 William Newell as Waiter  
 Ruth Robinson as Nurse  
 Lillian West as Nurse

References

Bibliography
 Bernard A. Drew. Motion Picture Series and Sequels: A Reference Guide. Routledge, 2013.

External links
 

1939 films
1939 comedy films
American comedy films
Films directed by Malcolm St. Clair
20th Century Fox films
American black-and-white films
1930s English-language films
1930s American films